Rosalba pulchella is a species of beetle in the family Cerambycidae. It was described by Belon in 1903. It is known from Brazil.

References

Rosalba (beetle)
Beetles described in 1903